Lapsias is a spider genus of the jumping spider family, Salticidae.

Phylogeny
Lapsias, Galianora and Thrandina are informally classified as "lapsiines". These are believed to be basal jumping spiders. While Galianora and Thrandina are sister genera, it is not certain if they form a clade with Lapsias, or if the common characteristics are symplesiomorphic.

Description
Lapsias lorax is typical of the genus, with large eyes and prominent male palps. There is a short video of Lapsias lorax, showing typical jumping spider behavior.

Species
, the World Spider Catalog accepted 12 species:
 Lapsias canandea Maddison, 2012 – Ecuador
 Lapsias ciliatus Simon, 1900 – Venezuela
 Lapsias cyrboides Simon, 1900 – Venezuela
 Lapsias estebanensis Simon, 1900 – Venezuela
 Lapsias guamani Maddison, 2012 – Ecuador
 Lapsias iguaque (Muñoz-Charry, Galvis & Martínez, 2022) – Colombia
 Lapsias lorax Maddison, 2012 – Ecuador
 Lapsias quimbaya (Muñoz-Charry, Galvis & Martínez, 2022) – Colombia
 Lapsias tayrona (Muñoz-Charry, Galvis & Martínez, 2022) – Colombia
 Lapsias tequendama (Muñoz-Charry, Galvis & Martínez, 2022) – Colombia
 Lapsias tovarensis Simon, 1901 – Venezuela
 Lapsias walekeru (Muñoz-Charry, Galvis & Martínez, 2022) – Colombia

Lapsias melanopygus Caporiacco, 1947 is considered a doubtful name (nomen dubium).

References

  (2006a): "New lapsiine jumping spiders from Ecuador (Araneae: Salticidae)." Zootaxa 1255: 17–28. PDF

Further reading
  (2006): "Lapsiines and hisponines as phylogenetically basal salticid spiders (Araneae: Salticidae)." Zootaxa 1255: 37–55. PDF

External links
 Salticidae.org: Diagnostic drawings of L. estebanensis, L. ciliatus, L. cyrboides, L. tovarensis

Salticidae
Spiders of South America
Salticidae genera